Agononida norfocerta is a species of squat lobster in the family Munididae. The species name is a combination of Norfolk Ridge and the Latin word incerta, the feminine version of the word incertus, meaning "doubtful." It is found in the southwestern Pacific Ocean and near the Norfolk Ridge, where its specific epithet comes from.

References

Squat lobsters
Crustaceans described in 2012